Jeffrey John Crowe (born 14 September 1958) is a former New Zealand cricketer. He played Test and One Day International cricket for New Zealand from 1983 to 1990, and first-class cricket for South Australia and then Auckland.

He has been an ICC match referee since 2004.

Early and personal life
Crowe was born in Auckland, New Zealand. He is the son of Dave Crowe, and the elder brother of Martin Crowe. The Crowe brothers are cousins of Oscar-winning actor Russell Crowe, whose father John Alexander Crowe is the brother of Dave Crowe; their grandfather John Doubleday Crowe, emigrated to New Zealand from Wrexham in Wales. He is also the great-grandson of All Black Francis Jervis (his mother's maternal grandfather).

Crowe's father played in three first-class cricket matches for Canterbury and Wellington between 1953 and 1957.

Domestic career
Crowe began his first-class cricket career at South Australia, where he played from 1977–78 to 1981–82.  There was a suggestion that he could play for the Australian cricket team, but he returned to New Zealand in 1982–83 to play for Auckland, from with the hope of playing for New Zealand instead. He worked on his fielding, and also occasionally kept wicket.

After a benefit season at Auckland in 1990–91, and one more domestic season, he retired from playing professional cricket at the end of the 1991–92 season.

International career
He was born just over 4 years before his younger brother Martin, but he made his Test debut for New Zealand in the First Test against Sri Lanka at Christchurch in March 1983, just over a year after his brother.  He scored his maiden Test century (128) in the Third Test against England in Auckland in February 1984.

Playing against the dominant West Indies team in 1984–85, his team was following on 225 runs in arrears in the Fourth Test at Sabina Park in Kingston, Jamaica, in May 1985.  Crowe went in at number 3 in the second innings, with the score at 1–13. Against a fierce fast bowling attack that included Courtney Walsh, Malcolm Marshall and Joel Garner, he scored his second Test century (112); but despite his heroics, New Zealand still lost by 10 wickets.

He was captain of the New Zealand cricket team for six Tests – a one-off Test against Sri Lanka at Colombo in April 1987 (when he scored the third and last of his Test centuries, 120 not out in a drawn match) and then three on tour to Australia in December 1987, and finally two at home against England in February 1988. One of the matches against Australia was lost, and the other five were drawn. Crowe played his last Test against Australia at Wellington in March 1990.  He also played in 75 ODIs from 1983 to 1990, including the Cricket World Cups in England in 1983 and in India in 1987.

After cricket
Crowe was manager of the New Zealand cricket team from 1999 to 2003.  He ran a golfing holiday business in Florida for a period, and since 2004 he has been an ICC match referee, including the World Cup finals in 2007 and 2011.  He is one of three people to have been referee in more than 75 Tests (the others are Chris Broad and Ranjan Madugalle) and one of four to have been referee in more than 220 ODIs (as well as Crowe, Broad, and Madugalle, the fourth is Roshan Mahanama). In January 2017 he refereed his 250th ODI match, when he officiated the fifth ODI between Australia and Pakistan at the Adelaide Oval.

See also
 Elite Panel of ICC Referees

References

External links
 
 Jeff Crowe: 12 facts about the former New Zealand skipper, criclife.com, 14 September 2015
 Jeff Crowe: Former New Zealand skipper who is one of the top match referees in the current era, cricketcountry.com, 14 September 2013

1958 births
Living people
New Zealand cricketers
New Zealand One Day International captains
New Zealand One Day International cricketers
New Zealand Test cricket captains
New Zealand Test cricketers
Cricketers at the 1983 Cricket World Cup
Cricketers at the 1987 Cricket World Cup
Auckland cricketers
South Australia cricketers
Cricket match referees